Island Lake is one of many small alpine lakes in the southern Cascade Range in the U.S. state of Oregon. It is one of the largest of the more than 200 bodies of water in the Sky Lakes Wilderness, which straddles the crest of the Cascades.

Named for the small island in its center, Island Lake is in Klamath County and the Rogue River – Siskiyou National Forest. Red Lake Trail runs along the eastern shore of the lake and meets the Pacific Crest Trail a fraction of a mile to the southeast.

The lake is restocked periodically and supports natural reproduction.

See also
 List of lakes in Oregon

References

Lakes of Oregon
Lakes of Klamath County, Oregon
Rogue River-Siskiyou National Forest